Montville is a town in Waldo County, Maine, United States. The population was 1,020 at the 2020 census.

History
Montville was incorporated on February 18, 1807, and was named for the French word for "mountain town".

Geography
Principle bodies of water are Trues Pond (173 acres), Kingdom Bog (90 acres), Ledge Pond (24 acres) and Mud Pond (15 acres). The town is crossed by state routes SR 220 and SR 3. It borders the towns of Knox to the northeast, Morrill to the east, Searsmont to the southeast, Liberty to the southwest, Palermo to the west and Freedom to the northwest. The Town Office is located on 414 Center Rd.

Montville is home to part of Frye Mountain Wildlife Management Area. It is also home to part of James Dorso (Ruffingham Meadow) WMA.

Demographics

2010 census
As of the census of 2010, there were 1,032 people, 433 households, and 294 families living in the town. The racial makeup of the town was 96.1% White, 0.4% African American, 0.1% Native American, 0.4% Asian, 0.7% from other races, and 2.3% from two or more races. Hispanic or Latino of any race were 2.2% of the population.

There were 433 households, of which 32.1% had children under the age of 18 living with them, 55.0% were married couples living together, 6.9% had a female householder with no husband present, 6.0% had a male householder with no wife present, and 32.1% were non-families. 25.6% of all households were made up of individuals, and 8.3% had someone living alone who was 65 years of age or older. The average household size was 2.38 and the average family size was 2.83.

The median age in the town was 43.6 years. 22.4% of residents were under the age of 18; 4.9% were between the ages of 18 and 24; 25.1% were from 25 to 44; 32.8% were from 45 to 64; and 14.8% were 65 years of age or older. The gender makeup of the town was 49.7% male and 50.3% female.

2000 census
As of the census of 2000, there were 1,002 people, 391 households, and 279 families living in the town.  The population density was 23.5 people per square mile (9.1/km).  There were 483 housing units at an average density of 11.3 per square mile (4.4/km).  The racial makeup of the town was 98.00% White, 0.10% African American, 0.10% Native American, 0.10% Asian, 0.90% from other races, and 0.80% from two or more races. Hispanic or Latino of any race were 1.00% of the population.

There were 391 households, out of which 35.8% had children under the age of 18 living with them, 59.1% were married couples living together, 5.9% had a female householder with no husband present, and 28.4% were non-families. 21.0% of all households were made up of individuals, and 6.9% had someone living alone who was 65 years of age or older.  The average household size was 2.56 and the average family size was 3.00.

In the town, the population was spread out, with 26.4% under the age of 18, 6.7% from 18 to 24, 29.7% from 25 to 44, 27.3% from 45 to 64, and 9.8% who were 65 years of age or older.  The median age was 37 years. For every 100 females, there were 102.4 males.  For every 100 females age 18 and over, there were 100.3 males.

The median income for a household in the town was $32,434, and the median income for a family was $37,917. Males had a median income of $25,391 versus $23,583 for females. The per capita income for the town was $14,112.  About 9.9% of families and 14.5% of the population were below the poverty line, including 18.0% of those under age 18 and 12.2% of those age 65 or over.

Historic Sites in Montville
Ebenezer Knowlton House

Notable people 

 Ebenezer Knowlton, U.S. Representative from Maine, Free Will Baptist minister, and co-founder of Bates College in Lewiston, Maine
 Carol Weston, state legislator

References

External links
 Town of Montville, Maine
 Maine Genealogy: Montville, Waldo County, Maine
 Maine Office of Tourism

Towns in Waldo County, Maine
Towns in Maine
Populated places established in 1807
1807 establishments in Massachusetts